was a Japanese computer gaming company, founded on October 1, 1985 and dissolved on February 9, 2009. SETA was headquartered in Kōtō, Tokyo, with a branch in Las Vegas, Nevada.

SETA developed and published games for consoles such as the Nintendo Entertainment System and the Super Nintendo Entertainment System. It created development tools for Nintendo's consoles. It made games in North America but mainly Japan, focusing on golf and puzzles. It developed the Aleck 64 arcade system, based on the Nintendo 64 console. SETA also assisted in the production of the SSV arcade system, alongside Sammy and Visco.

In 1999, Aruze became the parent company. SETA withdrew from the game business in 2004 after releasing Legend of Golfer on the GameCube. The company announced its closure in December 2008 due to Japan's declining economic state. SETA officially closed on January 23, 2009, with Aruze absorbing the company's assets. It was subsequently liquidated at the Tokyo District Court on May 25, 2009.

Subsidiaries

Former subsidiaries
UD Technology Inc (ユーディテック・ジャパン株式会社): In 2003-12-20, UD Technology Inc announced merging into SETA Corporation, effective on 2004-04-01. The merged entity became SETA Corporation's Unified Communication business headquarter.
IKUSABUNE Co.,Ltd. (株式会社企画デザイン工房戦船): Merged into SETA Corporation, and became SETA Corporation's Image Contents business headquarter on 2004-04-01.

Video games

Arcade
 U.S. Classic (1987; distributed by Taito in North America, one of America's top eight best-selling arcade games of 1989)
 Super Real Mahjong PV (1994; Japan's seventh highest-grossing arcade printed circuit board (PCB) software of 1995)

Nintendo Entertainment System
 J.B. Harold Murder Club
 The Adventures of Tom Sawyer
 Castle of Dragon (developed by Athena)
 Formula One: Built to Win
 Honshogi: Naitou Kudan Shogi Hiden
 8 Eyes
 Morita Shogi
 Magic Darts
 Silva Saga
 Bio Force Ape (Unreleased; a prototype version of the unreleased game was recovered and made available Online)
 UWC (Unreleased game based on the WCW; a review copy was uncovered in 2019.)

Game Boy
 Ayakashi no Shiro
 Battle Bull
 QBillion
 Torpedo Range

Super NES/Super Famicom
 A.S.P.: Air Strike Patrol
 Cacoma Knight in Bizyland (English version only - Original Japanese version by Datam Polystar)
 F1 ROC: Race Of Champions
 F1 ROC II: Race of Champions
 GD Leen
 Hayazashi Nidan Morita Shogi
 Hayazashi Nidan Morita Shogi 2
 Kendo Rage (Makeruna Makendo) (English version only - Original Japanese version by Datam Polystar)
 Musya: The Classic Japanese Tale of Horror (English version only - Original Japanese version by Datam Polystar)
 Super Stadium
 Nosferatu
 The Wizard of Oz
 Shodan Morita Shogi
 Silva Saga II: The Legend of Light and Darkness
 Super Real Mahjong P4
 Super Real Mahjong P5 Paradise

TurboGrafx-16/PC Engine
 Super Real Mahjong P5 Custom

Nintendo 64
 Chopper Attack
 Eikō no Saint Andrews
 Saikyō Habu Shōgi
 Morita Shogi 64
 Tetris 64

PlayStation
 Kanazawa Shogi '95

Saturn
 Shougi Matsuri
 Super Real Mahjong P5
 Super Real Mahjong P6
 Super Real Mahjong P7
 Super Real Mahjong Graffiti
 Kanazawa Shougi
 Real Mahjong Adventure "Umi-He": Summer Waltz

GameCube
 Legend of Golfer

Xbox 360
 Project Sylpheed

M65C02
 Cal.50 - Licensed to Taito

Macintosh
 Super Real Mahjong P4

3DO
 Super Real Mahjong P4

Aleck 64

The Aleck 64 is the Nintendo 64 design in arcade form, designed by SETA in cooperation with Nintendo, and sold from 1998 to 2003 only in Japan. It essentially consists of a Nintendo 64 board retrofitted with the sound capabilities which are standard for arcade games of the time. Nintendo and SETA began working on their agreement for the board in 1996, hoping to recreate the business model Namco and Sony Computer Entertainment displayed with the Namco System 11, to facilitate conversions of arcade games.

Eleven Beat (developed with Hudson Soft)
Hanabi de Doon! - Don-chan Puzzle (developed with Aruze)
Hi Pai Paradise (developed with Aruze)
Hi Pai Paradise 2 - onsen ni ikou yo! (developed with Aruze)
Kurukuru Fever (developed with Aruze)
Magical Tetris Challenge: Featuring Mickey (developed with Capcom)
Mayjinsen 3
Star Soldier: Vanishing Earth (developed with Hudson Soft)
Super Real Mahjong VS
Aleck Bordon Adventure 4th Story: Tower & Shaft (developed with Aruze and Altron)
Vivid Dolls (developed with Visco)
Variant Schwanzer (developed with Sigma) (unreleased)

Notes

References

External links
 (archives) 

Video game publishers
Video game companies established in 1985
Video game companies disestablished in 2009
Defunct video game companies of Japan
Japanese companies established in 1985
Japanese companies disestablished in 2009
Video games developed in Japan